Ondřej Šiml (born 19 April 1986) is a Czech football player who currently plays for Táborsko, on loan from FK Dukla Prague. He has represented his country at under-19 level.

Career
After making his league debut in the Czech First League in 2006 for FC Viktoria Plzeň, Šiml was sent out to Czech 2. Liga side FK Chmel Blšany on loan in the summer of 2006. He played in the Bohemian Football League in the autumn part of the 2008–09 season, captaining Plzeň's B-team. Šiml returned to the second league in February 2009, joining FK Dukla Prague. Following Dukla's promotion to the Czech First League, he made six appearances for the club in the 2011–12 season. He spent the 2012–13 season on loan at Bohemians 1905, before moving to Táborsko on loan in July 2013.

References

External links
 
 Ondřej Šiml player profile, Dukla Prague
 Ondřej Šiml – FK Chmel Blšany

1986 births
Living people
Czech footballers
Czech Republic youth international footballers
Czech First League players
FC Viktoria Plzeň players
FK Chmel Blšany players
FK Dukla Prague players
Bohemians 1905 players
FC Silon Táborsko players
Association football midfielders